Venmani Vishnu Nambudiripad was an early 19th-century Malayalam poet belonging to the well known Venmani family. He was the uncle of famous Venmani Achhan Nambudiripad. He was also involved in religious and philosophical pursuits. Some of his works include Ganapath Praathal, Raghuvamsam and Samsariyute Paaraavasyam.

See also
Venmani Illam
Malayalam Literature

References
http://namboothiri.com/articles/malayalam-literature.htm

Malayalam-language writers
19th-century Indian poets